A chilled margin is a shallow intrusive or volcanic rock texture characterised by a glassy or fine-grained zone along the margin where the magma or lava has contacted air, water, or particularly much cooler rock. This is caused by rapid crystallization of the melt near the contact with the surrounding low temperature environment. In an intrusive case, the crystallized chilled margin may decrease in size or disappear by later remelting during magma flow, depending on magma heat flux.

The feature is often seen in dikes or sills, and especially in sheeted dike complexes, where multiple chilled margins are a distinctive feature.

Pillow lavas often show such chilled margins which are glassy and prove the sudden cooling undergone due to contact with water.

External links
H.E. Huppert and R.S.J. Sparks (1989): Chilled margins in igneous rocks. Earth and Planetary Science Letters, volume 92, issues 3–4, pages 397-405.

Igneous petrology